Matija Šegavac  (Serbian Cyrillic: Матија Шегавац; born 1 February 1995) is a Serbian goalkeeper who plays for Radnički Sremska Mitrovica. He made his debut for Donji Srem's the first team in season 2012–13.

Career statistics

References

External links
 
 
 Stats at utakmica.rs

Association football goalkeepers
Serbian footballers
Serbian SuperLiga players
Serbian First League players
FK Donji Srem players
FK Cement Beočin players
FK BSK Borča players
1995 births
Living people